Maryann Krieglstein (born July 11, 1944), is an American academic social worker and human services professor emeritus at the College of DuPage. She previously served as the coordinator of sexual assault services for the YWCA of DuPage and the coordinator of the human services program at the College of DuPage. Her research on domestic violence and heterosexism in social work has been published in the American Journal of Community Psychology and the Journal of Human Behavior in the Social Environment.

Career

Academic 

In 1967, Krieglstein received her Bachelor of Science from Mundelein College. She went on to receive her Master of Social Work in 1970 from University of Illinois at Chicago (UIC) and later returned to receive her Ph.D. in social work from UIC's Jane Addams College of Social Work in 2002. Prior to receiving her Ph.D., she taught part-time as an adjunct professor with the College of DuPage. In 1997, during her Ph.D. studies, Krieglstein accepted a full-time teaching position at Aurora University's George Williams College of Social Work. She spent several years at Aurora University before accepting an associate professorship with the human services department at the College of DuPage. Later, Krieglstein became coordinator of the human service program, and retired in 2013 with a Professor Emeritus position at the college.
As Coordinator of the Human Services Program at COD, Krieglstein helped build a partnership between COD and Edward Hines, Jr., VA Hospital with the goal of facilitating integration between the college's veterans training program and the hospital's veterans health services. This partnership helped COD to become the first community college to receive the Governor’s Award for Excellence in Education by the Illinois Department of Veterans Affairs in 2012. Additionally during Krieglstein's leadership, the Human Services Program won the college's first Center of Excellence award, a $150,000 grant awarded by the college president to a COD program that stands out among other College of DuPage academic entities as well as among other national programs. Krieglstein has two published journal articles on her research into heterosexism in school social work and one co-authorship on the effects of welfare reform on domestic violence. She also authored a text book chapter entitled "Heterosexism and Social Work: An Ethical Issue".

Community organizer 

Krieglstein has worked with a wide range of communities in her various professional roles. In the mid nineties, she was the Coordinator of Sexual Assault Services for the YWCA of DuPage county. While teaching at the College of DuPage, she organized the yearly Child Abuse/Sexual Assault Awareness Fair, Domestic Violence Awareness Fair and local Take Back the Night event. Her work with domestic violence also included a longterm relationship with the homeless and domestic violence shelter Family Shelter Services, as well as the Hamdard Center which serves Chicago's South Asian and Middle Eastern communities.
The College of DuPage was the venue for the annual Friendship Powwow, coordinated by Krieglstein and co-hosted by the American Indian Center in Chicago, which brought together upwards of "30 different Native American tribes, including the Sioux, Navajo, and Oneida". Additionally, Krieglstein's work with Native American peoples included the formation of the American Indian Interest Group with fellow COD professors. The interest group's goal was to develop public activities that would raise awareness of American Indians living in the Chicago area. In 2007, she worked as the local organizer for the Coalition of Immokalee Workers' protest against McDonald's, headquartered in nearby Oak Brook, Illinois. Krieglstein secured the college's theater as an rally point for the protest, however, McDonald's reached an agreement with the workers just days before the event so the protest was turned into a strategy conference and victory celebration.
 
In addition to her organizer work, Krieglstein was a founding board member for the LGBT advocacy group Youth Outlook and sat on the advisory council for Family Shelter Services.

Personal life 

Krieglstein was born in Chicago on July 11, 1944. She was raised by her father after her mother died when Krieglstein was only four years old. Krieglstein is married to professor emeritus Werner Krieglstein. After attaining her master's degree, the two lived in a few places around the world including Finland and Morocco before settling down on an organic farm in Lawrence, Michigan. While farming, she continued to organize, collaborating with migrant farmers who work seasonally on Michigan orchards. In 1990, Krieglstein moved with her family to Glen Ellyn, Illinois, home to the College of DuPage where she later became a professor and Coordinator of the Human Services Program. Together, Maryann and Werner have five sons.

Awards and recognition 

(2001) Advisor of the Year Award, Aurora University
(2005) Recognized by Family Shelter Services for her work as an "Education Partner" with a breakfast event hosted by then US Senator Obama
(2007) Awarded the College of DuPage's 2007 Woman of Distinction
(2012) College of DuPage's Human Services Program won the college's Center of Excellence award during Krieglstein's leadership

Publications

References 

American social workers
1944 births
Aurora University alumni
University of Illinois Chicago alumni
People from Chicago
Living people
People from Glen Ellyn, Illinois